The 1975 Ontario general election  was held on September 18, 1975, to elect the 125 members of the 30th Legislative Assembly of Ontario (Members of Provincial Parliament, or "MPPs") of the Province of Ontario, Canada.

The Ontario Progressive Conservative Party, led by Bill Davis and campaigning under the slogan, "Your Future. Your choice.", won a tenth consecutive term in office but lost its majority in the legislature for the first time since the 1945 election. The PC party lost 27 seats from its result in the previous election.

The social democratic Ontario New Democratic Party, led by Stephen Lewis with the slogan "Tomorrow starts today", doubled its representation in the legislature, and became the Official Opposition on the strength of a campaign which called for rent control in Ontario and highlighted horror stories of individuals and bad landlords who imposed exorbitant rent increases.  The campaign forced the Davis' Tories to promise to implement rent controls shortly before the election.

The Ontario Liberal Party, led by Robert Nixon, won 15 additional seats, but lost the role of Official Opposition to the NDP. One member of its caucus was elected as a Liberal-Labour candidate.

Results

There were also 12 Social Credit League of Ontario candidates but they were not officially recognized as such as the party did not run enough candidates or otherwise qualify for official party status under the newly passed Election Finances Reform Act, 1975.

Riding results

|-
| style="background:whitesmoke;"|Algoma   
| 
|Bernt Gilbertson4,588 (35.63%)
|
|Ralph Nelson3,325 (25.83%)
||
|Bud Wildman4,962 (38.54%)
|
|
||
|Bernt Gilbertson
|-
| style="background:whitesmoke;"|Algoma—Manitoulin 
||
|John Lane5,452 (40.71%)
|
|Leo A Foucault3,589 (26.80%)
|
|Winston Baker4,352 (32.49%)
|
|
||
|John Lane
|-
| style="background:whitesmoke;"|Armourdale
|
|Mel Lastman12,100 (35.93%)
||
|Philip Givens14,739 (43.77%)
|
|M Mocciola6,255 (18.57%)
|
|David Liddiard (Ind)583 (1.73%)
||
|Gordon Carton
|-
| style="background:whitesmoke;"|Beaches—Woodbine
|
|Tom Wardle7,850 (34.15%)
|
|Ken Kory4,461 (19.40%)
||
|Marion Bryden10,500 (45.67%)
|
|C Negre (Comm)178 (0.77%)
||
|Tom Wardle
|-
| style="background:whitesmoke;"|Bellwoods
|
|Elio Madonia3,249 (25.19%)
|
|Millie Caccia4,482 (34.75%)
||
|Ross McClellan4,921 (38.15%)
|
|RJ Orlandini (Comm)247 (1.91%)
||
|John Yaremko
|-
| style="background:whitesmoke;"|Brampton
||
|Bill Davis16,555 (43.76%)
|
|Bill Agnew9,906 (26.19%)
|
|John Deamer10,793 (28.53%)
|
|AR Bullock (SC)258 (0.68%)Robert Simms (Ind)165 (0.44%)John MacLennan (Comm)152 (0.40%)
||
|Bill Davis
|-
| style="background:whitesmoke;"|Brantford
|
|Richard B. Beckett9,001 (29.17%)
|
|David Carll9,689 (31.40%)
||
|Mac Makarchuk12,048 (39.05%)
|
|WP Small (Comm) 115 (0.37%)
||
|Dick Beckett
|-
| style="background:whitesmoke;"|Brant—Oxford—Norfolk
|
|Don Harder6,572 (25.18%)
||
|Robert Nixon14,379 (55.09%)
|
|Jim Schneider4,791 (18.36%)
|
|A Kerr357 (1.37%)
||
|Robert Nixon
|-
| style="background:whitesmoke;"|Brock
||
|Bob Welch12,790 (52.28%)
|
|Margo Fyfe5,704 (23.32%)
|
|Fred Lindal5,969 (24.40%)
|
|
||
|Bob Welch
|-
| style="background:whitesmoke;"|Burlington South
||
|George Kerr16,761 (45.49%)
|
|Don Pennell11,278 (30.61%)
|
|Bill Brown8,808 (23.90%)
|
|John Lawson (Lbt)615 (1.66%)
||
|George Kerr
|-
| style="background:whitesmoke;"|Cambridge
|
|Ruggles Constant8,666 (29.04%)
|
|Claudette Millar9,772 (32.75%)
||
|Monty Davidson11,399 (38.20%)
|
|
||
|New District
|-
| style="background:whitesmoke;"|Carleton
||
|Sid Handleman12,867 (39.29%)
|
|Ben Franklin12,023 (36.72%)
|
|Bill Brown8,808 (23.90%)
|
|
||
|Sid Handleman
|-
| style="background:whitesmoke;"|Carleton East
|
|Darwin Kealey9,506 (28.58%)
|
|Paul Taylor11,776 (35.40%)
||
|Evelyn Gigantes11,981 (36.02%)
|
|
||
|Paul Taylor
|-
| style="background:whitesmoke;"|Carleton—Grenville
||
|Donald Irvine12,275 (53.32%)
|
|Howard Perkins5,006 (21.74%)
|
|Reg Willis5,741 (24.94%)
|
|
||
|Donald Irvine
|-
| style="background:whitesmoke;"|Chatham—Kent
||
|Darcy McKeough10,146 (43.69%)
|
|Jim Cooke7,347 (31.64%)
|
|Ron Franko5,728 (24.67%)
|
|
||
|Darcy McKeough
|-
| style="background:whitesmoke;"|Cochrane North
||
|René Brunelle9,650 (61.17%)
|
|Bernie Labonte2,398 (15.20%)
|
|René Brixhe3,728 (23.63%)
|
|
||
|René Brunelle
|-
| style="background:whitesmoke;"|Cochrane South
|
|Alan Pope9,787 (42.31%)
|
|Wayne Keon2,243 (9.70%)
||
|Bill Ferrier10,784 (46.62%)
|
|Robert Cochrane (SC)198 (0.86%)Peter Bruce (Ind) 119 (0.51%)
||
|Bill Ferrier
|-
| style="background:whitesmoke;"|Cornwall
|
|Rudy Villeneuve9,246 (39.62%)
|
|Madeleine Germain2,162 (9.27%)
||
|George Samis11,927 (51.11%)
|
|
||
|George Samis
|-
| style="background:whitesmoke;"|Don Mills
||
|Dennis Timbrell13,873 (46.35%)
|
|Donald Wright7,845 (26.21%)
|
|Bob Sherwood8,216 (27.45%)
|
|
||
|Dennis Timbrell
|-
| style="background:whitesmoke;"|Dovercourt
|
|George Nixon4,385 (31.92%)
|
|Agosto Venier3,013 (21.93%)
||
|Tony Lupusella5,748 (41.84%)
|
|William Stewart (Comm)500 (3.64%)Hugh Yearweood (Ind)91 (0.66%)
||
|George Nixon
|-
| style="background:whitesmoke;"|Downsview
|
|Barbara Greene5,832 (26.65%)
|
|Michael Spensieri7,962 (36.38%)
||
|Odoardo Di Santo8,090 (36.97%)
|
|
||
|Vern Singer
|-
| style="background:whitesmoke;"|Dufferin—Simcoe
||
|George McCague13,130 (45.94%)
|
|Bob Beattie11,539 (40.37%)
|
|Ian Perkins3,317 (11.61%)
|
|R Cornelsen (SC)596 (2.09%)
||
|George McCague
|-
| style="background:whitesmoke;"|Durham East
|
|Charles McIlveen10,782 (41.66%)
|
|Kirk Entwisle6,697 (21.91%)
||
|Doug Moffatt12,824 (41.96%)
|
|Ray Beacock (SC)258 (0.84%)
||
|Charles McIlveen
|-
| style="background:whitesmoke;"|Durham North
||
|Bill Newman11,226 (39.41%)
|
|Clare W Morrison11,071 (38.86%)
|
|Lesley Griffin6,189 (21.73%)
|
|
||
|Bill Newman
|-
| style="background:whitesmoke;"|Durham West
|
|Bill Pilkington7,675 (26.05%)
|
|Des Newman10,104 (34.29%)
||
|Charles Godfrey11,539 (39.16%)
|
|Ray Beacock (SC)258 (0.84%)
||
|New District
|-

| style="background:whitesmoke;"|Eglinton
||
|Roy McMurtry17,264 (52.30%)
|
|Frank Judge10,492 (31.79%)
|
|Eileen Elmy4,713 (14.28%)
|
|Ann Harris (SC)288 (0.87%)Donald Redekop (Ind)252 (0.76%)
||
|Leonard Reilly
|-
| style="background:whitesmoke;"|Elgin
||
|Ron McNeil11,940 (44.02%)
|
|Marietta Roberts10,078 (37.16%)
|
|Bob McNaughton5,104 (18.82%)
|
|
||
|Ron McNeil
|-
| style="background:whitesmoke;"|Erie
|
|John Buscarino4,646 (22.40%)
||
|Ray Haggerty9,185 (44.29%)
|
|Maurice Keck6,906 (33.30%)
|
|
||
|Ray Haggerty
|-
| style="background:whitesmoke;"|Essex North
|
|Fred Cada4,451 (20.53%)
||
|Dick Ruston9,550 (44.05%)
|
|Lucien Lacasse7,678 (35.42%)
|
|
||
|Dick Ruston
|-
| style="background:whitesmoke;"|Essex South
|
|Frank Klees7,378 (32.11%)
||
|Remo Mancini9,543 (41.53%)
|
|Ralph Wensley6,058 (26.36%)
|
|
||
|Remo Mancini
|-
| style="background:whitesmoke;"|Etobicoke
|
|Bill Stockwell7,134 (29.87%)
|
|Leonard Braithwaite7,758 (32.48%)
||
|Ed Philip8,995 (37.66%)
|
|
||
|Leonard Braithwaite
|-
| style="background:whitesmoke;"|Fort William
|
|Jim Jessiman8,216 (32.77%)
|
|Dale Willoughby7,449 (29.72%)
||
|Iain Angus9,173 (36.59%)
|
|Clifford Wahl (Comm)230 (0.92%)
||
|Jim Jessiman
|-
| style="background:whitesmoke;"|Frontenac—Addington
|
|Wilmer John Nuttall8,889 (38.34%)
||
|J. Earl McEwen10,380 (44.77%)
|
|Bill Barnes3,379 (14.57%)
|
|Ross Baker (Ind)539 (2.32%)
||
|W J Nuttall
|-
| style="background:whitesmoke;"|Grey
|
|Eric Winkler11,349 (43.95%)
||
|Bob McKessock11,637 (45.07%)
|
|Colin L Swan2,835 (10.98%)
|
|
||
|Eric A Winkler
|-
| style="background:whitesmoke;"|Grey-Bruce
|
|Gary Harron8,288 (34.73%)
||
|Eddie Sargent14,339 (60.09%)
|
|Lorne Creighton1,235 (5.18%)
|
|
||
|Eddie Sargent
|-
| style="background:whitesmoke;"|Haldimand-Norfolk
|
|James N Allan12,260 (39.06%)
||
|Gordon Miller14,161 (45.12%)
|
|Norm Walpole4,967 (15.82%)
|
|
||
|James N Allan
|-
| style="background:whitesmoke;"|Halton—Burlington
|
|Gary Dawkins10,543 (37.30%)
||
|Julian Reed11,076 (39.19%)
|
|Bill Johnson6,644 (23.51%)
|
|
||
|New District
|-
| style="background:whitesmoke;"|Hamilton Centre
|
|Maurice C Carter5,871 (25.51%)
|
|Bob Monte8,138 (35.36%)
||
|Mike Davison8,778 (38.14%)
|
|Art Walling (Comm)226 (0.98%)
||
|Norm Davison
|-
| style="background:whitesmoke;"|Hamilton East
|
|Bob Hodgson6,197 (21.21%)
|
|Joe Rogers8,425 (28.84%)
||
|Robert W. Mackenzie13,971 (47.83%)
|
|Bob Jaggard (Comm)411 (1.41%) Alcide Hamelin (SC) 207 (0.71%)
||
|Reg Gisborn
|-
| style="background:whitesmoke;"|Hamilton Mountain
||
|John Smith12,668 (38.63%)
|
|Ray C Edwards8,869 (27.04%)
|
|Brian Charlton11,075 (33.77%)
|
|Mike Mirza (Comm)185 (0.56%)
||
|John Smith
|-
| style="background:whitesmoke;"|Hamilton West
|
|Bob Morrow10,233 (36.27%)
||
|Stuart Smith10,737 (38.06%)
|
|Ray Fazakas7,243 (25.67%)
|
|
||
|Jack McNie
|-
| style="background:whitesmoke;"|Hastings-Peterborough
||
|Clarke Rollins10,679 (47.19%)
|
|Dave Hobson8,664 (38.28%)
|
|Bob Thompson2,961 (13.08%)
|
|Nancy Arnold (SC)328 (1.45%)
||
|Clarke Rollins
|-
| style="background:whitesmoke;"|High Park—Swansea
|
|Yuri Shymko8,442 (33.04%)
|
|Ed Negridge6,440 (25.21%)
||
|Ed Ziemba10,215 (39.98%)
|
|Steve Amsel (Comm)234 (0.91%)Ann Noble (Ind)217 (0.85%)
||
|Morton Shulman
|-
| style="background:whitesmoke;"|Humber
||
|John MacBeth17,576 (44.36%)
|
|Alex Marchetti14,408 (36.36%)
|
|Bob Curran7,639 (19.28%)
|
| 
||
|John MacBeth
|-
| style="background:whitesmoke;"|Huron-Bruce
|
|W E Walden5,955 (23.68%)
||
|Murray Gaunt16,561 (65.85%)
|
|Donald Milne2,635 (10.48%)
|
|
||
|Murray Gaunt
|-
| style="background:whitesmoke;"|Huron–Middlesex
|
|Jim Hayter8,010 (36.72%)
||
|Jack Riddell11,837 (54.26%)
|
|Paul Carroll1,967 (9.02%)
|
|
||
|Jack Riddell
|-
| style="background:whitesmoke;"|Kenora
||
|Leo Bernier8,907 (52.34%)
|
|Fred Porter2,945 (17.31%)
|
|Bill Watkins5,165 (30.35%)
|
|
||
|Leo Bernier
|-
| style="background:whitesmoke;"|Kent—Elgin
|
|Don Luckham7,561 (33.46%)
||
|Jack Spence12,793 (56.62%)
|
|Ray McGaffey2,242 (9.92%)
|
|
||
|Jack Spence
|-
| style="background:whitesmoke;"|Kingston and the Islands
||
|Keith Norton9,386 (37.54%)
|
|Ken Keyes9,270 (37.08%)
|
|Lars Thompson6,134 (24.54%)
|
|Ruth Miller (Comm)209 (0.84%)
||
|Syl Apps

|-
| style="background:whitesmoke;"|Kitchener 
| 
|Bill Pernfuss8,396 (28.66%)
||
|Jim Breithaupt13,124 (44.79%)
|
|Meg Young7,367 (25.14%)
|
|Evelina Pan (Comm)409 (1.39%)
||
|Jim Breithaupt
|-
| style="background:whitesmoke;"|Kitchener—Wilmot
|
|Colin O'Brian6,275 (25.62%
||
|John Sweeney10,029 (40.95%)
| 
|M. Rosenberg8,184 (33.42%)
|
|
||
|New District
|-
| style="background:whitesmoke;"|Lake Nipigon
|
|Gino Caccamo1,667 (15.02%)
| 
|Mike Power2,827 (25.47%)
||
|Jack Stokes6,603 (50.50%)
|
|
||
|New District
|-
| style="background:whitesmoke;"|Lakeshore
|
|Helen Wursta6,281 (22.45%)
| 
|John McPhee6,646 (23.76%)
||
|Patrick Lawlor14,271 (51.01%) 
|
|Neil McLellan (Comm.)602 (2.15%)Frederick Haight (Ind.)175 (0.63%)
||
|Patrick Lawlor
|-
| style="background:whitesmoke;"|Lambton
||
|Lorne Henderson11,007 (51.47%)
| 
|Fred McCormick9,199 (43.01%)
| 
|Maurice Payne1,181 (5.52%)
|
|
||
|Lorne Henderson
|-
| style="background:whitesmoke;"|Lanark
||
|Douglas Wiseman11,487 (56.33%)
| 
|Gary O'Neil5,842 (28.65%)
| 
|George Murray3,066 (15.05%)
|
|
||
|Douglas Wiseman
|-
| style="background:whitesmoke;"|Leeds
||
|James Auld13,913 (58.25%)
| 
|Edward Lanigan4,251 (17.78%)
| 
|John Fielding5,721 (23.95%)
|
|
||
|James Auld
|-
| style="background:whitesmoke;"|Lincoln
|
|Paul Prince7,914 (37.70%)
||
|Ross Hall8,983 (42.80%)
| 
|Ron Leavens4,092 (19.50%)
|
|
||
|Ross Hall
|-
| style="background:whitesmoke;"|London Centre
|
|Earle Terry9,018 (31.37%)
||
|David Peterson11,617 (40.56%)
| 
|Pat Chefurka7,896 (27.46%)
|
|Agnes Shaw (Ind.)219 (0.76%)
||
|New District
|-
| style="background:whitesmoke;"|London North
|
|Gordon Walker11,334 (36.72%)
||
|Marvin Shore13,962 (45.23%)
| 
|Mike Warren5,570 (18.05%)
|
| 
||
|Gordon Walker
|-
| style="background:whitesmoke;"|London South
|
|John Eberhard14,121 (39.14%)
||
|John Ferris14,773 (40/96%)
| 
|Edith Welch7,171 (19.88%)
|
| 
||
|John White
|-
| style="background:whitesmoke;"|Middlesex
||
|Robert G. Eaton10,092
| 
|Maurice Platts9,216
| 
|H. Aitkenhead3,127
|
| 
||
|New District
|-
| style="background:whitesmoke;"|Mississauga East
||
|Bud Gregory9,948
| 
|Irene Robinson8,630
| 
|Larry Taylor6,435
|
|Edmond Meyers (Ind.)430 
||
|New District
|-
| style="background:whitesmoke;"|Mississauga North
||
|Terry David Jones11,115 
| 
|Vince Zuccaro9,513 
| 
|David Busby10,787
|
| 
||
|New District
|-
| style="background:whitesmoke;"|Mississauga South
||
|Douglas Kennedy11,839 
| 
|Mike Garvey8,756
| 
|Danny Dunleavy7,102
|
| 
||
|New District
|-
| style="background:whitesmoke;"|Muskoka
||
|Frank Miller7,037 
| 
|Peggie Fitzpatrick3,262
| 
|Ken Cargill5,760 
|
|William Triska (SC)149
|| 
|Frank Miller
|-
| style="background:whitesmoke;"|Niagara Falls
|
|John Clement10,409
||  
|Vince Kerrio 10,626 
| 
|Peter Sobol7,003
|
| 
|| 
|John Clement
|-
| style="background:whitesmoke;"|Nickel Belt
|
|Gilles Pelland4,120 
| 
|Pat Owens2,871
|| 
|Floyd Laughren10,481 
|
| 
|| 
|Floyd Laughren
|-
| style="background:whitesmoke;"|Nipissing
|
|John Valiquette7,262
|| 
|Richard Smith15,390 
| 
|Mike O'Hallarn5,054
|
|Ed Diebel (Ind.)660 
|| 
|Richard Smith 
|-
| style="background:whitesmoke;"|Northumberland
|| 
|Russell Rowe13,397
| 
|Isobel Kirkpatrick10,315
| 
|John Taylor6,259 
|
| 
|| 
|Russell Rowe
|-
| style="background:whitesmoke;"|Oakville
|| 
|James Snow12,365 
| 
|McLean Anderson9,078
| 
|Doug Black5,969 
|
|Christina Morris (Ind.)97 
|| 
|James Snow
|-
| style="background:whitesmoke;"|Oakwood
|
|Joseph Marrese4,619 (25.5%)
| 
|Richard Meagher5,939	(32.8%) 
||  
|Tony Grande7,302	(40.3%)
|
|Val Bjarnason (Comm.)267	(1.5%)
||
|New District
|-
| style="background:whitesmoke;"|Oriole
|| 
|John Reesor Williams12,327 (38.8%)
| 
|Bob Reid12,035 (37.9%) 
| 
|Ken Crooke7,409 (23.3%) 
|
| 
||
|New District
|-
| style="background:whitesmoke;"|Oshawa
|
|Alan Dewar6,848 
| 
|Bill Menzies3,184
|| 
|Michael Breaugh14,442 
| 
|Lynn Rak (Comm.)145
|| 
|Charles McIlveen
|-
| style="background:whitesmoke;"|Ottawa Centre
|
|Gale Kerwin8,978	(32.78%) 
| 
|Gerald Kirby7,500 (27.39%)
||  
|Michael Cassidy10,658 (38.92%)
|
|Marvin Glass (Comm.)250 (0.91%) 
||  
|Michael Cassidy
|-
| style="background:whitesmoke;"|Ottawa East
|
|David Dehler5,001 (20.46%) 
|| 
|Albert Roy14,900	(60.96%)
| 
|Robert Cournoyer4,543 (18.59%) 
|
| 
||
|Albert Roy
|-
| style="background:whitesmoke;"|Ottawa South
|| 
|Claude Bennett14,767 (43.15%)
| 
|Patricia Thorpe8,360 (24.43%) 
| 
|Eileen Scotton11,099 (32.43%) 
|
| 
|| 
|Claude Bennett
|-
| style="background:whitesmoke;"|Ottawa West
|| 
|Donald Morrow14,956
| 
|Walter Ryan9,949 
| 
|Sue Findlay8,871 
|
| 
|| 
|Donald Morrow
|-
| style="background:whitesmoke;"|Oxford
|| 
|Harry Craig Parrott17,776 
| 
|Alice Garner12,595 
| 
|Peter Klynstra4,675
|
| 
|| 
|Harry Craig Parrott
|-
| style="background:whitesmoke;"|Parkdale
|
|Robert Orr3,816 (22.23%)
| 
|Stanley Mamak 5,599 (32.62%) 
|| 
|Jan Dukszta7,158 (41.71%)
|
| Kerry McCuaig (Comm.)(1.74%)Robert McKay (Ind.)203 (1.18%)Konrad Otta (Ind.)89 (0.52%)
|| 
|Jan Dukszta
|-
| style="background:whitesmoke;"|Parry Sound
|| 
|Lorne Maeck8,136 
| 
|Ed Fisher7,178 
| 
|Larry Labine2,973 
|
| 
||  
|Lorne Maeck
|-
| style="background:whitesmoke;"|Perth
|
|Bob Smith7,473 
||
|Hugh Edighoffer18,160 
| 
|Larry J. Wraith2,989 
|
| 
|| 
|Hugh Edighoffer
|-
| style="background:whitesmoke;"|Peterborough
|
|John Turner15,606 
| 
|Mike O'Toole8,986 
|| 
|Gillian Sandeman16,169 
|
|G. Van Houten (Comm.)80
||  
|John Melville Turner
|-
| style="background:whitesmoke;"|Port Arthur
|
|William Morgan7,595 (30.93%) 
| 
|Joseph Vander Wees4,499 (18.32%) 
|| 
|Jim Foulds12,213 (49.74%)
|
|Nancy McDonald	(Comm.)247 (1.01%) 
||  
|Jim Foulds
|-
| style="background:whitesmoke;"|Prescott and Russell
|| 
|Joseph Albert Bélanger11,023
| 
|Roger L. Charron9,026 
| 
|R. DesRochers5,027 
|
| 
||  
|Joseph Albert Bélanger
|-
| style="background:whitesmoke;"|Prince Edward—Lennox
|| 
|James A. Taylor9,810 
| 
|Keith MacDonald9,055 
| 
|Jan Nicol3,250 
|
| 
|| 
|James A. Taylor
|-
| style="background:whitesmoke;"|Quinte
|
|Robin Jeffrey11,738 
||  
|Hugh O'Neil12,448
| 
|C. McLaughlan4,744 
|
| 
||  
|Richard Potter
|-
| style="background:whitesmoke;"|Rainy River
|
|Allan Avis3,251 
|| 
|T. Patrick Reid5,839 
| 
|M. Lichtenstein2,259 
|
| 
|| 
|T. Patrick Reid
|-
| style="background:whitesmoke;"|Renfrew North
|
|Bob Cotnam6,779 
||  
|Sean Conway6,939
| 
|Robert Cox5,938 
|
| 
|| 
|Maurice Hamilton
|-
| style="background:whitesmoke;"|Renfrew South
|| 
|Paul Yakabuski14,082 
| 
|Howard Haramis8,289 
| 
|Lawrence Smith3,479 
|
|David Anderson (Ind.)408 
|| 
|Paul Yakabuski
|-
| style="background:whitesmoke;"|Riverdale
|
|Dick Perdue4,865 (26.8%) 
| 
|Nick Kapelos3,754 (20.7%) 
||  
|Jim Renwick9,133 (50.3%)
|
|Ed McDonald (Comm.)389 (2.2%)Walter Belej (Ind.)60	(0.3%)Armand Siksna (S.C.)31 (0.2%)
|| 
|Jim Renwick
|-
| style="background:whitesmoke;"|Sarnia
| 
|Carl Fleck8,773 (31.10%)
|| 
|Jim Bullbrook16,275 (57.69%)
| 
|Ivan Hillier2,957 (10.48%)
|
|Marek Wiechula (Lbt.) 204 (0.72%)
|| 
|Jim Bullbrook
|-
| style="background:whitesmoke;"|Sault Ste. Marie
|| 
|John Rhodes14,415 (42.46%)
| 
|Bob Gernon5,835 (17.19%) 
| 
|Ron Moreau13,470 (39.67%) 
|
|Gordon Massie232 (0.68%) 
|| 
|John Rhodes 
|-
| style="background:whitesmoke;"|Scarborough Centre
|| 
|Frank Drea10,329 (48.52%)
| 
|Ross Doswell5,067 (23.80%) 
| 
|Dave Gracey5,595 (26.28%) 
|
|Gareth Blythe (Comm.)200 (0.94%)R. M. Whidden (Ind.)96 (0.4%) 
||  
|Frank Drea
|-
| style="background:whitesmoke;"|Scarborough East
|| 
|Margaret Birch18,734 (54.0%) 
| 
|John Coates8,169 (23.5%) 
| 
|Ann Marie Hill7,271 (20.9%) 
|
|David Toothill539 (1.6%) 
|| 
|Margaret Birch 
|-
| style="background:whitesmoke;"|Scarborough North
|| 
|Thomas Wells16,427 (43.3%)
| 
|Gerry Phillips13,821 (36.4%)
| 
|Guy Beaulieu7,268 (19.1%)
|
|Robert Schultz (Ind.)438 (1.2%)
|| 
|Thomas Leonard Wells 
|-
| style="background:whitesmoke;"|Scarborough West
|
|Syd Brown7,738 (27.6%) 
| 
|Norm Kert4,422 (15.8%) 
||
|Stephen Lewis15,717 (56.1%) 
|
|Richard Sanders (Ind.)133 (0.5%) 
||
|Stephen Lewis
|-
| style="background:whitesmoke;"|Scarborough—Ellesmere
|
|Brian Harrison8,242 (34.1%)
| 
|Ken Tilley6,147 (25.5%)
||
|David Warner9,452 (39.2%)
|
|Scott Bell (Ind.)299 (1.2%)
||
|New District
|-
| style="background:whitesmoke;"|Simcoe Centre
|| 
|David Arthur Evans13,555 
| 
|Margaret Kelly9,116 
| 
|Paul Wessenger11,623 
|
| 
||  
|David Arthur Evans
|-
| style="background:whitesmoke;"|Simcoe East
|| 
|Gordon Elsworth Smith11,443
| 
|Elinor Bingham7,246 
| 
|Roger Pretty10,396 
|
| 
||  
|Gordon Elsworth Smith
|-
| style="background:whitesmoke;"|St. Andrew—St. Patrick
|| 
|Larry Grossman8,074 (36.6%) 
| 
|Fred Kan6,012 (27.3%) 
| 
|B. Beardsley7,627 (34.6%) 
|
|F. Cunningham (Comm.)333 (1.5%) 
|| 
|Allan Grossman 
|-
| style="background:whitesmoke;"|St. Catharines
|| 
|Robert Mercer Johnston10,064 (34.74%)
| 
|J.A. Rochefort9,270 (32.00%) 
| 
|Fred Dickson9,215 (31.81%) 
|
|Bruce Magnuson (Comm.)227 (0.78Lucylle Boikoff192 (0.66%)
||  
|Robert Mercer Johnston
|-
| style="background:whitesmoke;"|St. David
|| 
|Margaret Scrivener10,593 (40.5%)
| 
|June Rowlands7,153 (27.3%)  
| 
|Jim Lemon7,990 (30.5%) 
|
|Vincent Miller (Ind.)232 (0.9%)Anna Larsen (Comm.)205 (0.8%)
||  
|Margaret Scrivener
|-
| style="background:whitesmoke;"|St. George
|
|Frank Vasilkioti8,505 (33.3%) 
||   
|Margaret Campbell10,677 (41.8%)
| 
|Lukin Robinson5,858 (22.9%) 
|
|Elizabeth Hill	(Comm.)272 (1.1%)Marshall Evoy248 (1.0%) 
||    
|Margaret Campbell
|-
| style="background:whitesmoke;"|Stormont—Dundas—Glengarry
|| 
|Osie Villeneuve10,830 
| 
|Peter Manley6,988 
| 
|Gerard Lussier2,801 
|
| 
||
|New District
|-
| style="background:whitesmoke;"|Sudbury
|
|Joe Fabbro9,764 
| 
|Elmer Sopha10,236 
|| 
|Bud Germa11,511 
|
| 
||  
|Bud Germa
|-
| style="background:whitesmoke;"|Sudbury East
|
|Ray Plourde4,019 
| 
|Ron Horeck9,594 
||  
|Elie Martel18,650
|
| 
||  
|Elie Martel
|-
| style="background:whitesmoke;"|Timiskaming
|
|Ed Havrot6,997 
| 
|Howie Parker3,518 
||  
|Robert Bain 
|
|C. Larochelle (SC)169Ron Romanow (Ind.)165 
||   
|Ed Havrot
|-
| style="background:whitesmoke;"|Victoria—Haliburton
|
|Ronald Glen Hodgson9,960 
||  
|John Eakins11,005
| 
|F. McLaughlin3,718 
|
|Harry Hughes (SC)556 
||   
|Ronald Glen Hodgson
|-
| style="background:whitesmoke;"|Waterloo North
|
|Bob Gramlow7,275 
|| 
|Edward R. Good12,431
| 
|Jack Kersell6,880 
|
| 
|| 
|Edward R. Good
|-
| style="background:whitesmoke;"|Welland
|
|Allan Pietz9,000 
| 
|Loyola Lemelin8,262 
||
|Mel Swart10,209
|
|J. Severinsky (Comm.)231 
||
|Ellis Morningstar
|-
| style="background:whitesmoke;"|Wellington South
|
|Clara Marett6,209 
|| 
|Harry Worton13,810 
| 
|Carl Hamilton6,833 
|
| 
||
|Harry Worton
|-
| style="background:whitesmoke;"|Wellington—Dufferin—Peel
|| 
|Jack Johnson11,968 
| 
|Ted Sibbald11,159 
| 
|Gerry Campbell6,169 
|
| 
||
|New District
|-
| style="background:whitesmoke;"|Wentworth
|
|Matt Blair5,271 
| 
|John W. Harvey5,162 
|| 
|Ian Deans14,791
|
| 
|| 
|Ian Deans
|-
| style="background:whitesmoke;"|Wentworth North
|
|Donald Ewen11,346
|| 
|Eric Cunningham13,327
| 
|C. Faulknor8,180 
|
| 
|| 
|Donald Ewen
|-
| style="background:whitesmoke;"|Wilson Heights
| 
|David Rotenberg9,262 
||  
|Vernon Singer11,480 
|
|Howard Moscoe7,476
| 
|George Dance372
||
|New District
|-
| style="background:whitesmoke;"|Windsor—Riverside
|
|Bill Woolson3,671 (13.24%) 
| 
|Mike MacDougall10,793 (38.91%) 
|| 
|Fred Burr13,273 (47.85%)
|
|
||
|New District
|-
| style="background:whitesmoke;"|Windsor—Sandwich
|
|T. Vandereerden2,734 
| 
|Lyle Browning7,548 
|| 
|Ted Bounsall10,543
|
|J. Crouchman260M. Longmoore (Comm.)190
||
|New District
|-
| style="background:whitesmoke;"|Windsor—Walkerville
|
|Ron Moro4,041 
||  
|Bernard Newman12,659
| 
|David Burr6,923 
|
|N. Veronico (Comm.)155 
||  
|Bernard Newman
|-
| style="background:whitesmoke;"|York Centre
|
|Tony Roman12,968 (36.81)
|| 
|Alfred Stong14,347 (40.72%)
| 
|Tony Snedker7,748 (21.99%)
|
|John White (Ind.)171 (0.49%)
||
|Donald Deacon
|-
| style="background:whitesmoke;"|York East
|| 
| Arthur Meen14,544
|
|Fred Darke9,019 
| 
|Ed Chmielewski5,918 
| 
|C. Greenland (Ind.)696Nick Pieros437
||  
|Arthur Meen
|-
| style="background:whitesmoke;"|York Mills
|| 
|Bette Stephenson17,921 (45.7%)
| 
|Bruce Bone14,077 (35.9%)
| 
|Allan Millard7,252 (18.5%)
|
| 
|| 
|Dalton Bales
|-
| style="background:whitesmoke;"|York North
|| 
|William Hodgson12,914 
| 
|Margaret Britnell10,387 
| 
|Robert Lewis9,263 
|
| 
|| 
|William Hodgson
|-
| style="background:whitesmoke;"|York South
|
|James Trimbee7,083 (25.71%)
|
|Alan Tonks6,494 (23.57%)
||
|Donald C. MacDonald13,365 (48.50%)
|
|Mike Phillips (Comm)612 (2.22%)
||
|Donald MacDonald
|-
| style="background:whitesmoke;"|York West
||
|Nick Leluk13,871 (38.70%)
|
|Joseph Cruden12,515 (34.92%)
|
|Ian Barrett9,454 (26.38%)
|
|
||
|Nick Leluk
|-
| style="background:whitesmoke;"|Yorkview
|
|Dorlene Hewitt3,498 (13.67%)
|
|Ben Bellantone8,086 (31.61%)
||
|Fred Young13,406 (52.40%)
|
|John Sweet (Comm)594 (2.32%)
||
|Fred Young
|}

See also
Politics of Ontario
List of Ontario political parties
Premier of Ontario
Leader of the Opposition (Ontario)
Progressive Conservative Party of Ontario candidates, 1975 Ontario provincial election
Independent candidates, 1975 Ontario provincial election

References

Further reading
 

1975 elections in Canada
1975
1975 in Ontario
September 1975 events in Canada